Joanne Gignilliat Trimmier Woodward (born February 27, 1930) is an American actress. A star since the Golden Age of Hollywood, Woodward made her career breakthrough in the 1950s and earned esteem and respect playing complex women with a characteristic nuance and depth of character. She is one of the first film stars to have an equal presence in television. Her accolades include an Academy Award, three Primetime Emmy Awards, a British Academy Film Award, three Golden Globe Awards, and a Screen Actors Guild Award. She is one of the last surviving stars from the Golden Age of Hollywood cinema and the oldest living Best Actress Oscar-winner. 

Woodward is perhaps best known for her performance as a woman with dissociative identity disorder in The Three Faces of Eve (1957), which earned her an Academy Award for Best Actress and a Golden Globe Award for Best Actress in a Motion Picture – Drama. In a career spanning more than six decades, Woodward starred or co-starred in many feature films, receiving four Oscar nominations (winning one), ten Golden Globe Award nominations (winning three), four BAFTA Film Award nominations (winning one), and nine Primetime Emmy Award nominations (winning three).

Woodward is the widow of actor Paul Newman, with whom she often collaborated either as a co-star, or as an actor in films directed or produced by him. Woodward's career is notable not only for its unusual longevity, but for the range and depth of roles which she played. In 1960, she became the first person to receive a star on the Hollywood Walk of Fame.

In 1990, Woodward earned a bachelor's degree from Sarah Lawrence College at age 60, graduating alongside her daughter Clea.

Early life
Joanne Gignilliat Trimmier Woodward was born on February 27, 1930, in Thomasville, Georgia, the daughter of Elinor (née Trimmier) and Wade Woodward, Jr., who was vice president of publishing company Charles Scribner's Sons. Her middle names, "Gignilliat Trimmier", are of Huguenot origin. She was influenced to become an actress by her mother's love of film. Her mother named her after Joan Crawford. She has an older brother, Wade, Jr.

Attending the premiere of Gone with the Wind in Atlanta, nine-year-old Woodward rushed into the parade of stars and sat on the lap of Laurence Olivier, star Vivien Leigh's partner. She eventually worked with Olivier in 1977 in a television production of Come Back, Little Sheba. During rehearsals, she mentioned this incident to him, and he told her he remembered.

Woodward lived in Thomasville, then lived in Blakely and Thomaston before her family relocated to Marietta, Georgia, where she attended Marietta High School. She remains a supporter of Marietta High School and of the city's Strand Theater.

The family moved once again to Greenville, South Carolina, when she was a junior in high school, after her parents divorced. She attended and graduated from Greenville High School. She also performed at Greenville's Little Theater.

Woodward majored in drama at Louisiana State University, where she was an initiate of Chi Omega sorority, then headed to New York City to perform on the stage. There, she studied at the Actors Studio and also studied under Sanford Meisner in the Neighborhood Playhouse School of the Theatre.

Career

Early career

In 1952, Woodward made her first television appearance on an episode of Robert Montgomery Presents entitled "Penny." She also tried out for roles on the stage, becoming an understudy during the run of the William Inge drama Picnic in 1953–1954. It was here that she met her future husband Paul Newman, although at this time he was still married to his first wife Jacqueline Witte.

Woodward appeared in many other TV drama shows such as Tales of Tomorrow, Goodyear Playhouse, Danger, The Philco-Goodyear Television Playhouse, You Are There, The Web, The Ford Television Theatre, The Elgin Hour, Robert Montgomery Presents, Armstrong Circle Theatre, The Star and the Story, Omnibus, Star Tonight, and Ponds Theater.

Woodward's first feature film was a post-Civil War Western, Count Three and Pray (1955). Woodward was billed second, and played a strong-willed orphan. She was signed to a long-term contract by 20th Century Fox in January 1956. For her next role, she starred in A Kiss Before Dying (1956) as an heiress pursued by a college student (Robert Wagner) who will stop at nothing to win her over.

Woodward's career would continue to include TV, stage and feature film acting. In 1956 she returned to Broadway to star in The Lovers. It had only a brief run (but was later filmed as The War Lord (1965)). She also appeared on television drama shows including Philco Playhouse, The 20th Century-Fox Hour, The United States Steel Hour, General Electric Theater, Four Star Playhouse, Alfred Hitchcock Presents, Kraft Theatre, The Alcoa Hour, Studio One in Hollywood, and Climax.

Film stardom 
In 1957, Woodward astounded audiences and critics alike with her stellar performance as the lead in The Three Faces of Eve. Here she portrayed a woman with three distinct personalities — a southern housewife, a sexually voracious 'bad girl,' and a normal young woman — and gave each their own unique voices and gestures. For her work on the film, Woodward won an Academy Award for Best Actress.

With her credentials as a star attraction established, Fox gave her top billing in No Down Payment (1957), directed by Martin Ritt and produced by Jerry Wald. She was re-united with Ritt on another Faulkner adaptation, The Sound and the Fury (1959), with Yul Brynner. Sidney Lumet cast Woodward alongside Marlon Brando and Anna Magnani in The Fugitive Kind (1960), a box office disappointment. More popular was a third film with Newman, From the Terrace (1960), which Woodward later admitted to having "affection" for "because of the way I looked like Lana Turner". The couple then made Paris Blues (1961) with Ritt. For her title role in The Stripper  (1963), Joanne was coached in technique by burlesque performer Gypsy Rose Lee. In 1966, she appeared as Mary in A Big Hand for the Little Lady, and starred alongside Sean Connery in A Fine Madness. In Rachel Rachel (1968), produced and directed by Newman, Woodward played a schoolteacher hoping for love. This film won her an Academy Award nomination for Best Actress.

In 1972, Woodward starred in The Effect of Gamma Rays on Man-in-the-Moon Marigolds. For this performance as a mother estranged from her daughters, (one of them played by her actual daughter, Nell) she won the Best Actress Award at the Cannes Film Festival. She then starred in the mid-life crisis drama Summer Wishes, Winter Dreams (1973), written by Stewart Stern, for which she received another Oscar nomination for Best Actress.

Woodward was to have co-starred with Robert Shaw in Strindberg's Dance of Death at Lincoln Center in 1974, but withdrew from the production during rehearsals. "New York puts a pressure on you that I don't react well to, with the critics and all that", she later said. "I like to act in a relaxed atmosphere."

Woodward supported Burt Reynolds in The End (1978), and as the 70s progressed did more television drama. She did A Christmas to Remember (1979) on TV. The decade ended with The Streets of L.A. (1979). Woodward also directed an episode of Family in 1979. For TV, she appeared in Come Back, Little Sheba (1977) with Laurence Olivier, and See How She Runs (1978). The latter won her an Emmy.

Woodward's credits in the 1980s included The Shadow Box (1980), directed by Newman, and Crisis at Central High (1981) for TV. She also returned to Broadway for Candida (1981–1982), a production directed by Michael Cristofer that was filmed in 1982. She starred in Harry & Son (1984), again directed by and co-starring Newman, and some television films, Passions (1984) and Do You Remember Love (1985). Woodward also did some screenwriting and direction at this time, for instance writing and directing a 1982 production of Shirley Jackson's story Come Along with Me; and starred in The Glass Menagerie (1987).

Woodward also found critical success on the small screen. She won Emmy Awards for her work as an actress on See How She Runs (1978) and Do You Remember Love? (1985). As a producer, she won another Emmy for Broadway's dreamers: The Legacy of the Group Theater in 1990. Woodward also returned to TV to do "The 80 Yard Run" for Playhouse 90.

Partnership with Paul Newman 

Woodward met Paul Newman on the set of the stage drama, Picnic, in the early 1950s, and the two married on January 29, 1958, after his divorce from his first wife Jacqueline Witte was finalized. Woodward was soon an Academy Award winner, winning her Oscar on March 28. Although he was nominated many times, Newman would not achieve a win until 1986.

They appeared in many films together during the 1950s and 60s. The first was The Long Hot Summer (1958), followed by Rally 'Round the Flag, Boys! (1958), From the Terrace (1960), Paris Blues (1961), and A New Kind of Love (1963). They returned to Broadway in Baby Want a Kiss (1964), which ran for more than a hundred performances. Woodward was also directed by her husband in many projects. The first of these was Newman's directorial debut, Rachel, Rachel (1968). Husband and wife both earned Golden Globe Awards and Oscar nominations. They also acted together in Winning (1969) and WUSA (1970).

Only two months after their wedding, Woodward won her first Academy Award. Newman got his first nomination later that year, 1958, for Cat On a Hot Tin Roof. Both at the top of their game as film stars, Woodward and Newman became a celebrity power couple and were featured in countless magazines and articles for the next fifty years. Woodward's family life, she felt, deepened at the expense of her film career. She later said:Initially, I probably had a real movie-star dream. It faded somewhere in my mid-30s, when I realized I wasn't going to be that kind of actor. It was painful. Also, I curtailed my career because of my children. Quite a bit. I resented it at the time, which was not a good way to be around the children. Paul was away on location a lot. I wouldn't go on location because of the children. I did once, and felt overwhelmed with guilt. Nevertheless, her acting career was successful and busy by any standard, as can be seen from the summary above. Her final screen performance with Newman was in the cable miniseries Empire Falls in 2005.

Later years 
Woodward's film career had an exceptional longevity. In 1990, she again appeared opposite Newman in Mr. and Mrs. Bridge (1990), directed by James Ivory. Woodward had read this, the first of Evan S. Connell's two novels, when it was published in 1959. She hoped for many years to adapt it into a television production. Originally, she did not intend to play the character of Mrs. Bridge because she was too young. By the late 1980s, that was no longer the case. One of her most acclaimed performances, she garnered her fourth Academy Award nomination, and was selected as the year's Best Actress at the New York Film Critics Circle Awards.

In 1993, Woodward appeared in the film Philadelphia, with Tom Hanks, and, in the same year, narrated Martin Scorsese's The Age of Innocence. Woodward did two additional television films: Foreign Affairs (1993) and Blind Spot (1993). Woodward was a co-producer of Blind Spot, a drama about drug addiction, for which she was nominated for an Emmy Award for Outstanding Lead Actress – Mini-Series or a Movie. She co-starred in the television film Breathing Lessons (1995). Also in 1995, Woodward directed off-Broadway revivals of Clifford Odets' Golden Boy and Waiting for Lefty at the Blue Light Theater Company in New York.

In the twenty-first century, Woodward moved more into production and directorial roles. She served as the artistic director of the Westport Country Playhouse from 2001 to 2005. She was executive producer of the 2003 television production of Our Town, featuring Newman as the stage manager (for which he was nominated for an Emmy Award). She and Newman also appeared in Empire Falls (2005) for TV. Woodward also recorded a reading of singer John Mellencamp's song "The Real Life" for his box set On the Rural Route 7609.

She had the lead in Change in the Wind (2010). In 2011, she narrated the Scholastic/Weston Woods film All the World.

In 2022, Woodward and Newman were the subject of a six-part documentary by Ethan Hawke, The Last Movie Stars, which premiered on HBO Max.

Personal life
Woodward was reported to have been engaged to author Gore Vidal before she married Paul Newman. However, there was no real engagement; Woodward claims that she was a beard for Vidal, who was bisexual. Woodward shared a house with Vidal in Los Angeles for a short time, and they remained friends.

Woodward first met Newman at their agent's office.  They were both understudies for the play Picnic in 1953.  In the midst of this they starred in  The Long, Hot Summer in 1957. Newman divorced his wife Jackie Witte, with whom he already had three children, and married Woodward on January 29, 1958, in Las Vegas. On March 28 of the same year, Woodward won the Academy Award for Best Actress for The Three Faces of Eve. The couple remained married for 50 years until Newman's death from lung cancer on September 26, 2008. Woodward has said: "He's very good looking and very sexy and all of those things, but all of that goes out the window and what is finally left is, if you can make somebody laugh .... And he sure does keep me laughing." Newman attributed their relationship success to "some combination of lust and respect and patience. And determination."

When Paul Newman was asked, in an interview with Playboy magazine, how he remained faithful to Woodward, Newman responded, "I have steak at home; why go out for hamburger?"

Woodward has three daughters with Newman: Elinor Teresa "Nell" (1959), Melissa Stewart (1961), and Claire Olivia "Clea" (1965).

Woodward and Newman were mentors to Allison Janney, whom they had met when Janney, a Kenyon College freshman, was cast in a play that Newman directed. Janney acknowledged this support in a 2018 speech.

Woodward and Newman were active supporters of the Democratic Party. They were conspicuous supporters of Senator Eugene McCarthy in his unsuccessful 1968 presidential campaign, attending a benefit for his campaign at Arthur's Restaurant on April 1, 1968. Documents declassified in 2017 show that the National Security Agency had created a biographical file on Woodward as part of its monitoring of prominent US citizens whose names appeared in signals intelligence.

In 1988, Newman and Woodward established the Hole in the Wall Gang Camp, a nonprofit residential summer camp, and year-round center named after the Wyoming mountain hideaway of the outlaws in Newman's film Butch Cassidy and the Sundance Kid. The camp, located in Ashford, Connecticut, provides free services to 20,000 children and their families coping with cancer and other serious illnesses. In 2012, their daughter Clea Newman took charge of the camp's parent organization, the SeriousFun Children's Network.

In 1990, after working toward her bachelor's degree for more than 10 years, Woodward graduated from Sarah Lawrence College along with her daughter Clea. Paul Newman delivered the commencement address, during which he said he dreamed that a woman had asked, "How dare you accept this invitation to give the commencement address when you are merely hanging on to the coattails of the accomplishments of your wife?" In 1992, along with Newman, Woodward was awarded the Kennedy Center honors for lifetime achievement.

Woodward, widowed since 2008, lives in Westport, Connecticut, where she and Newman raised their daughters. She has retreated from public life since she was diagnosed with Alzheimer's disease in 2007.

Filmography

Film

Television

Awards

In 1958, Woodward won the Academy Award for Best Actress for The Three Faces of Eve. In 1960, she won the Silver Shell for Best Actress at the San Sebastián International Film Festival  for her work on The Fugitive Kind .  She was nominated for Best Actress in 1969 for Rachel, Rachel; in 1974 for Summer Wishes, Winter Dreams; and in 1991 for Mr. and Mrs. Bridge. She was named Best Actress at the Cannes Film Festival in 1974 for her performance in The Effect of Gamma Rays on Man-in-the-Moon Marigolds.

Woodward won two Emmy Awards for Outstanding Lead Actress in a Mini-Series or TV Movie: for See How She Runs (1978), as a divorced teacher who trains for a marathon; and in Do You Remember Love? (1985), as a professor who begins to suffer from Alzheimer's disease. She has been nominated an additional five times for her roles on television.

A popular (but untrue) bit of Hollywood lore is that Woodward was the first celebrity to receive a star on the Hollywood Walk of Fame. In fact, the original 1,550 stars were created and installed as a unit in 1960; no one star was officially "first". The first star actually completed was director Stanley Kramer's. The origin of this legend is not known with certainty, but according to Johnny Grant, the long-time Honorary Mayor of Hollywood, Woodward was the first celebrity to agree to pose with her star for photographers, and therefore was singled out in the collective public imagination as the first awardee.

In 1994, Joanne Woodward and Paul Newman were jointly presented the Award for Outstanding Public Service Benefiting the Disadvantaged, an award given out annually by Jefferson Awards for Public Service.

References

Further reading

External links

1930 births
Living people
American film actresses
American stage actresses
American television actresses
Best Actress Academy Award winners
Best Actress BAFTA Award winners
Best Drama Actress Golden Globe (film) winners
Best Miniseries or Television Movie Actress Golden Globe winners
Cannes Film Festival Award for Best Actress winners
Outstanding Performance by a Lead Actress in a Miniseries or Movie Primetime Emmy Award winners
Outstanding Performance by a Female Actor in a Miniseries or Television Movie Screen Actors Guild Award winners
Screen Actors Guild Life Achievement Award
Actresses from Georgia (U.S. state)
Kennedy Center honorees
Louisiana State University alumni
People from Thomasville, Georgia
People from Westport, Connecticut
Neighborhood Playhouse School of the Theatre alumni
Sarah Lawrence College alumni
20th-century American actresses
21st-century American actresses
Recipients of the Four Freedoms Award
Racing drivers' wives and girlfriends
Newman family (acting)
Greenville Senior High School (Greenville, South Carolina) alumni
People from St. George, Staten Island
Connecticut Democrats
People with Alzheimer's disease